Joseph Elleweyn Thomas (born August 29, 1980) is an American former football cornerback who played in the National Football League (NFL) and Canadian Football League (CFL). He was drafted by the Green Bay Packers in the third round of the 2004 NFL Draft. He played college football at Montana State.

Thomas was also a member of the New Orleans Saints, Dallas Cowboys, Edmonton Eskimos and Miami Dolphins.

The past few years, Thomas was the head football coach at Ballard High School in Seattle Washington. However, he decided to become the head coach at Garfield High School in Seattle.

Early years
Thomas attended Kennedy Catholic High School in Burien, Washington and was a student and a letterman in football. In football, he played quarterback and defensive back, and as a quarterback, he was a two-time All-Area selection and a two-time All-State selection. As a junior defensive back, he had eight interceptions, which ranked second in the state. Thomas graduated from John F.Kennedy High School in 1999.

Professional career

Green Bay Packers
Thomas was drafted out of Montana State University in the third round of the 2004 NFL Draft by the Green Bay Packers. Thomas was later waived by Green Bay on November 2, 2005.

New Orleans Saints
He was then picked up by the New Orleans Saints on November 3, 2005.

Oakland Raiders
Thomas signed with the Oakland Raiders on May 3, 2010.

External links
Green Bay Packers bio
Miami Dolphins bio

1980 births
Living people
Players of American football from Seattle
Players of Canadian football from Seattle
American football cornerbacks
American players of Canadian football
Canadian football defensive backs
Washington Huskies football players
Montana State Bobcats football players
Green Bay Packers players
New Orleans Saints players
Dallas Cowboys players
Edmonton Elks players
Miami Dolphins players
Oakland Raiders players
People from Burien, Washington